Birkner is a populated area in St. Clair County, Illinois. A mine of the same name operated from prior to 1882 to 1889. During that time, the mine was operated by Edward Avery & Company, Dutch Hollow Coal Company, and the Consolidated Coal Company of St. Louis.

Birkner can be seen on the French Village U.S. Geological Survey Map.

References

Populated places in St. Clair County, Illinois
Coal mining